George Hetzel Baird (March 5, 1907 – September 4, 2004) was an American sprint runner who won a gold medal in 4 × 400 m relay at the 1928 Summer Olympics, breaking the world record in the process. A week later he helped to set another world record, at 3:13.4 in the 4×440 yard relay in London. Baird graduated from the University of Iowa and later took various jobs during the Great Depression. He assisted his brother Bill as a puppeteer, and later became an assistant professor of education at the New York University.

References

External links

 
 Obituary: George Hetzel Baird

1907 births
2004 deaths
American male sprinters
Athletes (track and field) at the 1928 Summer Olympics
Olympic gold medalists for the United States in track and field
Iowa Hawkeyes men's track and field athletes
Medalists at the 1928 Summer Olympics
People from Grand Island, Nebraska
Track and field athletes from Nebraska